During the 1999–2000 English football season, Portsmouth F.C. competed in the Football League First Division.

Season summary
Manager Alan Ball's contract was terminated on 9 December with Portsmouth in the relegation zone. He was replaced by Bristol City manager Tony Pulis, who steered the club to survival in the First Division.

The end of the season saw the retirement of club goalkeeping legend Alan Knight, who made 801 career appearances over 22 years, all spent at Fratton Park. His final appearance came in a First Division match against Norwich City at Carrow Road in January.

Kit
Portsmouth ended their kit manufacturing deal with Admiral after two years, to manufacture their own kits under the brand name "Pompey Sport".

Final league table

Results
Portsmouth's score comes first

Legend

Football League First Division

FA Cup

League Cup

First-team squad

Left club during season

References

Portsmouth F.C. seasons
Portsmouth F.C.